Babylonian astronomy collated earlier observations and divinations into sets of Babylonian star catalogues, during and after the Kassite rule over Babylonia. These star catalogues, written in cuneiform script, contained lists of constellations, individual stars, and planets. The constellations were probably collected from various other sources. The earliest catalogue, Three Stars Each, mentions stars of Akkad, of Amurru, of Elam and others.
Various sources have theorized a Sumerian origin for these Babylonian constellations, but an Elamite origin has also been proposed. A connection to the star symbology of Kassite kudurru border stones has also been claimed, but whether such kudurrus really represented constellations and astronomical information aside from the use of the symbols remains unclear.

Star catalogues after Three Stars Each include the MUL.APIN list named after the first Babylonian constellation , "the Plough", which is the current Triangulum constellation plus Gamma Andromedae. It lists, among others, 17 or 18 constellations in the zodiac. Later catalogues reduce the zodiacal set of constellations to 12, which were borrowed by the Egyptians and the Greeks, still surviving among the modern constellations.

Three Stars Each
The first formal compendia of star lists are the Three Stars Each texts appearing from about the twelfth century BC. They represent a tripartite division of the heavens: the northern hemisphere belonged to Enlil, the equator belonged to Anu, and the southern hemisphere belonged to Enki. The boundaries were at 17 degrees North and South, so that the Sun spent exactly three consecutive months in each third. The enumeration of stars in the Three Stars Each catalogues includes 36 stars, three for each month. The determiner glyph for "constellation" or "star" in these lists is MUL, originally a pictograph of three stars, as it were a triplet of AN signs; e. g. the Pleiades are referred to as a "star cluster" or "star of stars" in the lists, written as MUL.MUL, or MULMUL.

MUL.APIN

The second formal compendium of stars in Babylonian astronomy is the MUL.APIN, a pair of tablets named for their incipit, corresponding to the first constellation of the year,  "The Plough", identified with Triangulum plus Gamma Andromedae. The list is a direct descendant of the Three Stars Each list, reworked around 1000 BC on the basis of more accurate observations. They include more constellations, including most circumpolar ones, and more of the zodiacal ones.
The Babylonian star catalogues entered Greek astronomy in the 4th century BC, via Eudoxus of Cnidus and others.
A few of the constellation names in use in modern astronomy can be traced to Babylonian sources via Greek astronomy. Among the most ancient constellations are those that marked the four cardinal points of the year in the Middle Bronze Age, i.e.
Taurus "The Bull", from (𒀯𒄞𒀭𒈾) MULGU4.AN.NA "The Steer of Heaven", marking vernal equinox
Leo "The Lion", from (𒀯𒌨) MULUR.GU.LA "The Lion", marking summer solstice
Scorpius "The Scorpion", from (𒀯𒄈𒋰) MULGIR.TAB "The Scorpion", marking autumn equinox
Capricornus "Goat-Horned", from (𒀯𒋦𒈧𒄩) MULSUḪUR.MAŠ "The Goat-Fish", marking winter solstice. It is a mythological hybrid depicted on boundary stones from before 2000 BC as a symbol of Ea.

There are other constellation names which can be traced to Bronze Age origins, including Gemini "The Twins", from (𒀯𒈦𒋰𒁀𒃲𒃲) MULMAŠ.TAB.BA.GAL.GAL "The Great Twins", Cancer "The Crab", from (𒀯𒀠𒇻) MULAL.LUL "The Crayfish", among others.

The MUL.APIN gives 
a catalogue of 71 stars and constellations of the "Three Ways" of the Three Stars Each tradition. The star names (prefixed with MUL 𒀯) are listed with the associated deity (prefix DINGIR 𒀭) and often some other brief epithet.
dates of heliacal risings
pairs of constellations which rise and set simultaneously
time-intervals between dates of heliacal risings
pairs of constellations which are simultaneously at the zenith and at the horizon
the path of the moon and planets.
a solar calendar
the planets and the durations of their solar conjunctions
stellar risings and planetary positions for predicting weather and for adjusting the calendar
telling time by length of the gnomon shadow
length of night watches during the year
omens connected with the appearance of stars, planets, MUL.U.RI.RI (comets?), and winds.

Zodiacal constellations
The path of the Moon as given in MUL.APIN consists of 17 or 18 stations, recognizable as the direct predecessors of the 12 sign zodiac. At the beginning of the list with MUL.MUL, the Pleiades, corresponds to the situation in the Early to Middle Bronze Age when the Sun at vernal equinox was close to the Pleiades in Taurus (closest in the 23rd century BCE), and not yet in Aries.

The "Tail" and the "Great Swallow" (items 15 and 16 above) have also been read as a single constellation the "Tail of the Swallow" (Pisces).  This is the source of the uncertainty over the number of constellations — 17 or 18 — in the Babylonian "zodiac".  All constellations of the Iron Age 12-sign zodiac are present among them, most of them with names that clearly identify them, while some reached Greek astronomy with altered names; thus "Furrow" became Virgo, "Pabilsag" Sagittarius, "Great One" Aquarius, "Swallow Tail" Pisces and "Farm Worker" was reinterpreted as Aries.

Virgo, and her main star Spica, have Babylonian precedents. The MUL.APIN associates Absin "The Furrow" with the Sumerian goddess Shala, and on boundary stones of the Kassite era Shala is conventionally depicted as holding a length of grain. Regarding Sagittarius, Pabilsag is a comparatively obscure Sumerian god, later identified with Ninurta. Another name for the constellation was Nebu "The Soldier".

Aquarius "The Water-Pourer" represents Ea (a water god), dubbed "The Great One" in the MUL.APIN. It contained the winter solstice in the Early Bronze Age. In Greek astronomy, he became represented as simply a single vase from which a stream poured down to Piscis Austrinus. The name in the Hindu zodiac is likewise kumbha "water-pitcher", showing that the zodiac reached India via Greek intermediaries.

The current definition of Pisces is the youngest of the zodiacal constellations. The "Swallow" of Babylonian astronomy included the western fish, but was larger as it included as well parts of Pegasus. The square of Pegasus was the constellation of the "field",  shown in the Dendera zodiac between the two fishes. The northern fish and part of Andromeda represented the goddess Anunitum, the "Lady of the Heaven". Late Babylonian sources mention also DU.NU.NU "The Fish-Cord". It is unclear how the "Farm Worker" of the MUL.APIN became Aries "The Ram" of Greek tradition, possibly by a pun or misunderstanding.

Somewhere around the 5th century BCE, Babylonian astronomical texts began to describe the positions of the Sun, Moon, and planets in terms of 12 equally-spaced signs, each one associated with a zodiacal constellation, each divided into 30 degrees (uš). This normalized zodiac is fixed to the stars and totals 360 degrees.

See also 
 Babylonian astrology
 Babylonian calendar
 Constellation
 Enuma Anu Enlil
 Triple deity
 Venus tablet of Ammisaduqa

Notes

References
John H. Rogers, "Origins of the ancient constellations: I. The Mesopotamian traditions", Journal of the British Astronomical Association 108 (1998) 9–28
 Verderame, Lorenzo, "The Primeval Zodiac: Its Social, Religious, and Mythological Background", in J.A. Rubiño-Martín et al., Cosmology Across Cultures, ASP Conference Series 409, San Francisco, 2009, 151-156.

Babylonian astronomy
Former constellations